Tubercithorax is a genus of sheet weavers that was first described by K. Y. Eskov in 1988.

Species
 it contains only two species.
Tubercithorax furcifer Eskov, 1988 – Russia
Tubercithorax subarcticus (Tanasevitch, 1984) – Russia (Europe, Siberia)

See also
 List of Linyphiidae species (Q–Z)

References

Araneomorphae genera
Linyphiidae
Spiders of Russia